Rate of turn may refer to:

 Standard rate turn, a reference for aircraft maneuvering
 Rate of turn indicator, the rate a ship is turning

See also
 Rate of return, profit on an investment over a period of time
 Rate (disambiguation)
 Turn (disambiguation)